Easy Money is a 1934 British comedy film directed by Redd Davis and starring Lilian Oldland, Gerald Rawlinson and George Carney. It was a quota quickie made at British and Dominions Elstree Studios.

Cast
 Lilian Oldland as Joan Letchworth  
 Gerald Rawlinson as Jock Durant  
 George Carney as Boggie  
 Laurence Hanray as Mr. Pim  
 Hubert Leslie as Colonel Hinckley  
 Harvey Braban as Williams  
 Gladys Hamer as Maggie  
 René Ray as Typist 
 Margot Grahame

References

Bibliography
 Low, Rachael. Filmmaking in 1930s Britain. George Allen & Unwin, 1985.
 Wood, Linda. British Films, 1927-1939. British Film Institute, 1986.

External links

1934 films
British comedy films
1934 comedy films
Films directed by Redd Davis
Films set in England
Quota quickies
British black-and-white films
British and Dominions Studios films
Films shot at Imperial Studios, Elstree
1930s English-language films
1930s British films